The Sir Wilfrid Laurier School Board (SWLSB, CSSWL) is a school board headquartered in Rosemère, Quebec in Greater Montreal.

It officially came into existence in July 1998 when English-language schools from eight former school boards were amalgamated. Laurenval School Board, Laurentian School Board and Laurentienne School Trustees were merged, and the English sector of the other school boards of the Laval, Laurentides and Lanaudière administrative regions joined to form the new administrative entity.

The Sir Wilfrid Laurier School Board is the third largest Anglophone school board in the Province of Quebec, Canada.

Service area
The service area, over  large, includes the City of Laval and the Laurentides and Lanaudière regions.

Wards 11-19 serve portions of Laval.

Communities in Ward 1:

Communities in Ward 2:
Estérel
Mille-Isles
Morin-Heights
Saint-Sauveur
Sainte-Adèle
Sainte-Marguerite-du-Lac-Masson
Wentworth
Wentworth-Nord
Portions of Grenville-sur-la-Rouge

Communities in Ward 3:
Brownsburg-Chatham
Grenville
Lachute
Portions of Grenville-sur-la-Rouge

Communities in Ward 4:

Communities in Ward 5:
Kanesatake
Oka
Pointe-Calumet
Saint-André-d'Argenteuil
Saint-Joseph-du-Lac
Sainte-Marthe-sur-le-Lac
Saint-Placide
Portions of Deux-Montagnes

Communities in Ward 6:
 Saint-Eustache
 Portions of Deux-Montagnes
 Portions of Mirabel

Communities in Ward 7:
 Blainville
 Boisbriand
 Sainte-Anne-des-Plaines
 Sainte-Thérèse
 Portions of Terrebonne (in areas formerly in La Plaine)

Communities in Ward 8:
Bois-des-Filion
Lorraine
Rosemère

Communities in Ward 9:
Charlemagne
Mascouche
Repentigny
Portions of Terrebonne (within areas formerly in the Lachenaie and old Terrebonne municipalities)

Communities in Ward 10:

Administrative facilities
The board's head office is in the Administrative Centre on Montée Lesage in Rosemère, next to Rosemere High School. The board's Educational Services/Complementary Services Centre is located in Rosemere High School near the gymnasiums, adjacent to the administrative building.

The district previously had its headquarters in the Duvernay area of Laval.

Schools
This school board oversees 26 elementary schools, 10 high schools, 5 adult and vocational centres, in which over 15,000 students are enrolled.

Elementary schools
 Arundel - Arundel
 Crestview - Laval
 Franklin Hill - Repentigny
 Genesis - Laval
 Grenville - Grenville-sur-la-Rouge
 Hillcrest Academy - Laval
 John F. Kennedy - Laval
 Joliette - Saint-Charles-Borromée
 Jules Verne - Laval
 Laurentia - St-Jérôme
 Laurentian - Lachute
 McCaig  - Rosemère
 Morin Heights - Morin-Heights
 Mountainview - Deux-Montagnes
 Our Lady of Peace - Laval
 Pierre Elliott Trudeau - Blainville
 Pinewood - Mascouche
Pinewood Elementary School, which is part of the Sir Wilfrid Laurier School Board, is located in Mascouche, Quebec. The school admits kindergarten through sixth grade students. Prior to merging with Lewis King Elementary School, the institution used to be named Holy Rosary School, as it is next to Holy Rosary Catholic Church on Chemin des Anglais.
 Rawdon - Rawdon
 Souvenir - Laval
 St-Jude - Deux-Montagnes
 St-Paul/St-Paul Annex - Laval
 St-Vincent - Laval
 Ste-Adèle - Ste-Adèle
 Ste-Agathe Academy - Ste-Agathe-des-Monts
 Terry Fox - Laval
 Twin Oaks - Laval

High schools
 Joliette High - Joliette
 Lake of Two Mountains - Deux-Montagnes
 Laurentian Regional - Lachute
 Laval Junior Academy - Laval
 Laval Senior Academy - Laval
 Phoenix Alternative - Laval
 Rosemere High School - Rosemère
 Ste-Agathe Academy - Ste-Agathe-des-Monts
 Mountainview (Batshaw) - Prévost

Adult Education

 CDC Laurier Boisbriand - Boisbriand
 CDC Laurier Lachute - Lachute
 CDC Laurier Pont-Viau - Laval
 CDC Laurier Repentigny - Repentigny
 CDC Laurier Vimont - Laval

Former schools 
Secondary:
 Mother Teresa Junior High School (French: Mère-Teresa) - Laval
 Laval Junior High School
 Sacred Heart Middle School - Laval
 Batshaw High School (Prévost)
 Laurier Senior High School (formerly used as Laval Catholic High School)
 Laval Liberty High School
 Western Laval High School (separated in 2005 into Laval Liberty HS and Laval JHS)

Primary:
 Holy Rosary - Mascouche
 Lewis King - Mascouche

See also
 Area Francophone school boards within the SWLSB territory:
 Commission scolaire de la Seigneurie-des-Mille-Îles
 Commission scolaire de Laval
 Commission scolaire de la Rivière-du-Nord
 Commission scolaire des Samares
 List of English educational institutions in Quebec
 Other Anglophone school boards in the Montreal area:
 English Montreal School Board
 Lester B. Pearson School Board
 Riverside School Board

References

External links
SWLSB website (French - English)
CDC Laurier website (French - English)
 List of SWLSB school web sites

Education in Laval, Quebec
School districts in Quebec
Quebec English School Boards Association
Education in Laurentides
Education in Lanaudière